Calliotropis rhysa is a species of sea snail, a marine gastropod mollusk in the family Eucyclidae.

Description
The height of the shell attains  6.5 mm.

Distribution
This marine species is found off Sombrero Island, Antigua.

References

External links
 To Encyclopedia of Life
 To World Register of Marine Species

rhysa
Gastropods described in 1879